Devagiri-M-Narendra is a village in Dharwad district of Karnataka, India.

Demographics
As of the 2011 Census of India there were 527 households in Devagiri-M-Narendra and a total population of 2,439 consisting of 1,220 males and 1,219 females. There were 355 children ages 0-6.

References

Villages in Dharwad district